Adams Peak is the highest mountain peak in the Diamond Mountains of the Sierra Nevada, located on the border of Plumas and Lassen Counties, California.

The granitic summit is 8,199 ft (2,499 m) in elevation. The mountain burned during the 2021 Beckwourth Complex.

See also

References

Mountains of Lassen County, California
Mountains of Northern California
North American 2000 m summits